Robert Evans is an American author, journalist, and podcast host who has reported on global conflicts and online extremism. A former editor at the humor website Cracked.com, Evans now writes for the investigative journalism outlet Bellingcat while working on several podcasts, including Behind the Bastards, Behind the Police, Behind the Insurrections, It Could Happen Here, The Women's War, and Worst Year Ever. In 2021 he published his first novel, After The Revolution, in a serialized podcast.

Career

Early career
Evans worked at the humor website Cracked as an editorial manager. In that position, Evans led a team that published "personal experience" articles. These articles fell into two main categories: journalistic pieces involving a variety of sources and personal narratives.

In 2016 Evans published his first book, A Brief History of Vice, about the formative effects of narcotics on the development and history of civilization.

Journalism
Evans has done reporting for the investigative reporting outlet Bellingcat between 2018 and 2021.
He has reported on conflicts in Iraq, Ukraine, and Rojava, as well as on far-right extremists in the United States. 

In the late 2010s and early 2020s, Evans produced a variety of content about 8chan, an anonymous message board, as well as the Gamergate controversy movement, a movement he describes as largely organically generated, with some direction given by white supremacists and extremists with long experience in radicalizing people on internet forums.

Following the March 2019 Christchurch mosque shootings, news outlets including Rolling Stone, Vox, and The Atlantic referenced Evans' warning about the nature of the shooter's manifesto. Evans argued that the manifesto was merely a red herring, full of references and memes meant to distract observers. Following the 2019 Poway synagogue shooting, Vox relied on Evans' work to explain how the shooter's manifesto again constituted a 74-page in-joke meant to further radicalize other 4chan /pol/ users.

In a 2020 Bellingcat article, Evans discussed the emergence and qualities of the boogaloo movement, a loose-knit group of individuals who express interest in fomenting American civil unrest. Evans says that he became aware of the boogaloo movement when he observed members at 2020 Virginia Citizens Defence League Lobby Day.

Portland George Floyd protests
Starting in late May 2020, Evans covered the George Floyd protests in Portland, Oregon. He began reporting in the first days of the protests by taking footage of protesters, counter-protesters, and police. His reporting on the protests was highlighted in the New York Times opinion section, which published an interview with Evans after the 50th day of protests about covering the events.

In July, Evans joined a class-action lawsuit against the City of Portland for police use of force at the protests. The suit is non-monetary, seeking instead "declaratory and injunctive relief — asking the court to find the plaintiffs within their rights and to order police to stop brutalizing and unlawfully arresting protesters." Evans joined freelance journalist Bea Lake and housing services specialist Sadie Oliver-Grey as a plaintiff. The suit alleges that police officers were unlawfully violent, stopped journalists from reporting, and interfered with the right to free speech. The suit describes incidents that occurred to Evans including the "police allegedly threatening him with arrest if he did not leave the area, shooting him in the foot with a tear gas grenade and spraying him, and repeatedly shoving him".

On Saturday, August 22, a right-wing protester wielding a baton broke Evans' hand while he was filming. In an interview with The Guardian, Evans said the right-wing counter-protesters "absolutely came prepared to fight", were "very aggressive from the jump", and were equipped with "knives, guns, paintball guns with frozen pellets, batons".

In August, the song "No Cock Like Horse Cock" became a popular protest song in the Pacific Northwest. It was unclear exactly how it became popularized, but Pepper Coyote, the artist who produced the song, surmised that protesters became aware of his work through a cover song that appeared on Evans' Behind the Bastards.

Podcasting career
Evans is the host of the podcast Behind the Bastards and one of three co-hosts of the podcast Worst Year Ever.
In 2019, Evans completed the podcast series The War on Everyone, a podcast about how white supremacy and fascism have developed and spread into the American consciousness in the modern age, as well as It Could Happen Here, a podcast about the possibility of a Second American Civil War. 
Evans published a new podcast series titled The Women's War in March and April 2020 about the primarily Kurdish autonomous region in Syria known as Rojava. 
Evans also published a Behind the Bastards podcast miniseries titled Behind the Police in June and July 2020, covering the history of policing in the United States to inform the present time of civil unrest. 
Behind the Police was cohosted by Jason Petty. In November 2020 through early 2021, Evans published Uprising: A Guide From Portland, a podcast detailing first-hand accounts of the 2020 George Floyd protests in Portland, Oregon.

Cool Zone Media
In August 2021, iHeartMedia announced a launch of a new podcast network "Cool Zone Media" helmed by Evans, who would become its head of content. The network would unite under one umbrella both existing and upcoming podcasts from Evans and his frequent collaborators such as Jake Hanrahan and Jason "Propaganda" Petty.

Podcasts
After The Revolution (2021): An audiobook version of Evans' debut fiction novel
Assault on America (2021): A mini-series that examines the events around the January 6th U.S. Capitol attack
Behind the Bastards (2018 - ): Evans' flagship and longest-running podcast series
Behind the Insurrections (2021): A mini-series detailing several historical coups, released following the 2021 United States Capitol attack
Behind the Police (2020): A mini-series on the history of American police, released in the wake of the 2020 George Floyd protests
Cracked Gets Personal (2017): Short lived show Evans co-hosted with R. Brandon Johnson while they worked for Cracked.com
It Could Happen Here (2019, 2021 - ): Originally a mini-series about the possibility of a Second American Civil War, later relaunched as a daily podcast
The War on Everyone (2019): A podcast where Evans details how white supremacy and fascism have developed and spread into the American consciousness in the modern age
The Women's War (2020): Evans details his experience visiting the Autonomous Administration of Rojava
Uprising: A Guide to Portland (2021): A first-hand report and background on then-ongoing Protests in Portland, Oregon
Worst Year Ever (2019 - 2022): A joint project with Katy Stoll, and Cody Johnston; originally started to discuss then-upcoming 2020 United States presidential election which with the beginning of the COVID-19 pandemic pivoted to a general topic weekly series

Bibliography

References

External links
 What You Need To Know About The Battle of Portland, a Bellingcat article by Robert Evans highlighted in various news outlets
 The War on Everyone, transcript of the podcast series available at the Anarchist Library

Living people
American male journalists
American podcasters
IHeartRadio digital channels
Journalists from Texas
American war correspondents
War correspondents of the Iraq War
University of Texas at Dallas alumni
Sam Houston State University alumni
Novelists from Texas
1988 births